This is a list of the extant lizard families. Lizards are an informal group of squamates.

Taxonomy
There are five infraorders which separate the lizards, these are: Diploglossa, Gekkota, Iguania, Platynota and Scincomorpha. This separation is based mainly on morphological similarities between family groups.

The Diploglossans and Platynotans are two closely related infraorders which are very diverse families. Very few generalisations can be placed upon these families morphologically. Many species are limbless, while others have fully formed limbs. It is believed that these lizards are the closest lizard relation to the snakes.

The Gekkotans are the second most diverse group of lizards. They can be morphologically distinguished by the absence of temporal arches, which allows greater moveability of the head. Most species also have cloacal sacs and fixed eyelids.

The Iguanians are another diverse group of lizards. All iguanians are fully limbed. Most species ambush their prey, capture it with their tongue and have skin modification, such as crests and fans, used for many different reasons.

The Scincomorphs are the most diverse group of lizards, accounting for almost half the species of lizards. The major distinguishing morphological feature of the Scincomorphs, is the presence of unsocketed teeth on the inner face of the jaw bones. They also lack the skin modifications present in many of the iguanians. This family contains varying degrees of limb reduction, from completely formed limbs to completely absent of limbs.

As with most taxonomic classifications, there are many different interpretations of the evolutionary relationships. These include moving of families to different infraorders, merging or splitting of the infraorders and merging and splitting of the families.

References
 
 

Lacertilia
Lacertilia